Keith Tyson (born Keith Thomas Bower, 23 August 1969) is an English artist. In 2002, he was the winner of the Turner Prize. Tyson works in a wide range of media, including painting, drawing and installation.

Early life
Bower moved to Dalton-in-Furness when he was four, adopting his stepfather's surname Tyson. He showed an interest in and talent for art at an early age, having been inspired by his "very creative and enthusiastic" primary school art teacher.  However he left school at the age of 15 without qualifications, and took employment as a fitter and turner with VSEL (Vickers Shipbuilding and Engineering Ltd., now BAE Systems) in Barrow-in-Furness.

  
In 1989, he began an art foundation course at the Carlisle College of Art, and the following year he moved south to take up a place on  experimental Alternative Practice degree at The Faculty of Arts and Architecture, University of Brighton (1990–93).

Career
During the 1990s, Tyson's practice was dominated by the Artmachine, which was the first means through which Tyson explored his ongoing interest in randomness, causality, and the question of how things come into being. The Artmachine was a method Tyson developed which used a combination of computer programmes, flow charts and books in order to generate chance combinations of words and ideas, which were then realised in practice as artworks in a wide range of media.

The results of the Artmachine became the basis of Tyson's earliest exhibited artworks; The Artmachine Iterations, as these works became known, established Tyson's reputation in the UK and internationally as an original artist and thinker, and by 1999 he had mounted solo exhibitions in London, New York, Paris and Zürich, as well as contributed to group shows throughout Europe, North America and Australia.

From 1999, Tyson's interests practice turned from the Artmachine towards an artistic approach which explored the same thematic terrain, but this time directly by his own hand. The first such body of work was entitled Drawing and Thinking. Many of these works were installed in the international exhibition in the 2001 Venice Biennale

In 2002, Tyson mounted Supercollider at South London Gallery and then the Kunsthalle Zürich in Switzerland. The name of the exhibition, derived from the popular name for the CERN particle accelerator in Geneva, indicated the significance of scientific ways of seeing and thinking about the world to Tyson's art at this time.

In December 2002, Tyson was awarded the British visual arts award, the Turner Prize. The other shortlisted artists that year were Fiona Banner, Liam Gillick and Catherine Yass. The Turner Prize was notorious that year not so much for the controversial nature of the work of the shortlisted artists as in previous years, but because of the comments of then Culture Minister Kim Howells. His comments that the Turner Prize exhibition at Tate Britain consisted of "cold, mechanical, conceptual bullshit" were greeted with both approval and criticism in the media.

In 2005,  The following year, Tyson first exhibited his most monumental and ambitious work to date, Large Field Array, in the Louisiana Museum of Modern Art in Denmark, which then travelled to the De Pont Museum of Contemporary Art in the Netherlands and The Pace Gallery in New York.  In 2009 Tyson's work was shown at the Hayward Gallery as part of the group exhibition "Walking in My Mind".

Artworks

The Artmachine Iterations
Only a fraction of the instructions issued from the Artmachine were realised as artworks (the Artmachine generated around 12,000 proposals which are still unmade), but many of the playful and inventive mixed media works that were created include a twenty-four foot painting made from bathroom sealant, and a painting using toothpaste and music CDs.

Large Field Array
Described by Walter Robinson as "nothing less than a complete Pop cosmology",  Large Field Array comprises 300 modular units, most formed from into implied 2-foot cubes; the cubes are arranged into a grid occupying both the floor and walls of a gallery when installed. Each highly crafted cubic sculpture represents a unique yet highly recognizable feature of the world, from popular culture to natural history. Sculptures as diverse as a representation of American Donald Trump’s wedding cake, a chimney with a bird on top of it with a satellite dish, and a chair made of skeletons, were all constructed and arranged. The installation invited the viewer/participant to negotiate his or her own path through a seemingly random assortment of images and ideas, echoing the mental processes which create free associations between disparate phenomena which so fascinate Tyson.

The Nature Paintings (2005–2008)
A mixture of paints, pigments and chemicals are allowed to interact in specific ways upon an acid primed aluminium panel. The combined processes of gravity, chemical reaction, temperature, hydrophobia and evaporation simultaneously conspire to create surfaces reminiscent of a wide range of natural forms and landscapes. In this respect, the paintings seem to be depict nature, but they are also created by nature as well.

Studio Wall Drawings (1997–present)
Collectively these works on paper represent Tyson’s sketchbook or journal. Each ‘Wall Drawing’ is made on a sheet of paper measuring 158 cm x 126 cm, the same dimensions as a small wall in Tyson's original studio where he used to draw-up notes. Over the years these sheets have recorded his ideas, emotional tone and mood, visits people made to the studio, world events and even economic fluctuations. They are often exhibited in large non-chronological grids to form solid walls of diverse images, and text.

References

Further reading
Solo and group exhibition catalogues
Cloud Choreography and Other Emergent Systems, Parasol Unit foundation for contemporary art, London, 2009
Martian Museum of Terrestrial Art, Barbican Art Gallery, London, 2008
Keith Tyson, Studio Wall Drawings 1997–2007, Haunch of Venison, London, 2007 
Keith Tyson, Large Field Array, Louisiana Museum, Denmark, 2006
How to Improve the World: 60 Years of British Art, Hayward Gallery, London, 2006
Keith Tyson, Geno Pheno, PaceWildenstein, New York/Haunch of Venison, London, 2005
Keith Tyson, History Paintings, 2005
Dionysiac, Centre Pompidou, Paris, 2005
Head to Hand, Drawings by Keith Tyson, Thea Westreich & Ethan Wagner, New York, 2002
Keith Tyson, Kunsthalle Zürich, Switzerland, 2002
Supercollider, South London Gallery, London, 2002
Turner Prize Exhibition, Tate Britain, London, 2002
Public Affairs, Kunsthaus Zürich, Switzerland, 2002
Century City: Art and Culture in the Modern Metropolis, Tate Modern, London, 2000
Over the Edges, SMAK-Stedelijk Museum voor Actuele Kunst, Gent, 2000
Dream Machines, Hayward Gallery, London, 2000

Secondary works
Mark Rappolt, 'Life, the Universe and Everything', Art Review, February 2007
Rachel Withers, ‘Keith Tyson’, Artforum, March 2005
Marcus Verhagen, 'Keith Tyson', Art Monthly, December 2004 - January 2005
Michael Archer, 'Primordial Soups', Parkett 71, 2004
Ethan Wagner and Keith Tyson, 'A Conversation', Parkett 71, 2004
Hans Rudolph Reust, 'Fabulous Art', Parkett 71, 2004
Tony Barrell, ‘Rising to the Equation’, Sunday Times Magazine, 30 November 2003 
Virginia Button, The Turner Prize: Twenty Years, Tate Publishing, 2003
Matthew Collings, Art Crazy Nation: The Post Blimey Art World, 21 Publishing Ltd, 2001
Louisa Buck, Moving Targets 2, A Users Guide to British Art Now, Tate Publishing, London, 2000

External links 
 
 Keith Tyson at The Pace Gallery
 Keith Tyson at Galerie Vallois Paris
 Keith Tyson at ARNDT Berlin
 Keith Tyson interview
 Keith Tyson at Tullie House

1969 births
Living people
English contemporary artists
English installation artists
Turner Prize winners
Alumni of the University of Cumbria
Alumni of the University of Brighton
People from Ulverston